Cosa Brava is an experimental rock and free improvisation group formed in March 2008 in Oakland, California by multi-instrumentalist and composer Fred Frith (Henry Cow, Skeleton Crew, Keep the Dog). The band comprises Frith on guitar, Zeena Parkins (Skeleton Crew, Keep the Dog) on keyboards and accordion, Carla Kihlstedt (Sleepytime Gorilla Museum) on violin, Matthias Bossi (Sleepytime Gorilla Museum) on drums, and The Norman Conquest on sound manipulation. All About Jazz described their music as "somewhere between folk, Celtic, modern chamber, Latin, funk, Eastern, and prog-rock".

Cosa Brava's first performance was in Oakland, California on March 20, 2008. They then went on to tour Europe in April 2008, playing in France, Germany, Austria, Slovenia, Italy, Belgium, Netherlands, Spain and Switzerland. In May 2008 they performed at the 25th Festival International de Musique Actuelle de Victoriaville in Victoriaville, Quebec, Canada, and in December 2008 at the Knitting Factory in New York City and the ICA in Boston.

Cosa Brava recorded their first album, Ragged Atlas in San Francisco in December 2008, which was released in March 2010. John Kelman in a review at All About Jazz said that the album "transcends time and genre" and is "one of 2010's most auspicious debuts". A second album entitled The Letter was released in March 2012.

Background
Fred Frith's career began as a "rock musician" with Henry Cow in 1968, but has since diversified into a number of different genres, from avant-garde jazz to contemporary classical music. He has written scores for film and dance, and music for orchestras and string quartets. He became Professor of Composition the Music Department at Mills College in Oakland, California in 1999. The motivation behind the formation of Cosa Brava arose out of Frith's nostalgia for rock music. He said, "I really miss what you can do with a rock band. I miss developing material through the push and pull of cooperative rehearsals, I miss what happens when you move away from 'the parts' and start formulating things with a collective ear, I miss the single-minded commitment to a group identity."

Frith had previously worked with Zeena Parkins in Skeleton Crew and Keep the Dog, and had collaborated with Carla Kihlstedt on several albums. The Norman Conquest had been a student of Frith's at Mills College.

Members
Fred Frith – guitar, bass guitar, keyboards, voice
Zeena Parkins – keyboards, accordion, foley objects, voice
Carla Kihlstedt –  violin, voice
Matthias Bossi – drums, voice
Shahzad Ismaily (from 2011) – bass guitar, voice
The Norman Conquest – sound manipulation

Discography
Ragged Atlas (2010, CD, Intakt Records, Switzerland)
The Letter (2012, CD, Intakt Records, Switzerland)

References

External links

Every Which Way: Experimentalist Fred Frith's Cosa Brava mixes multiple musical worlds The Boston Globe.
Cosa Brava at Inclinaisons.
Cosa Brava on Myspace.
 Fred Frith & Cosa Brava at All About Jazz.
 Cosa Brava at Vortice Associazione Culturale.
Cosa Brava concerts at Saudades Tourneen.
Cosa Brava review at FIMAV 2008. All About Jazz.
.

American experimental musical groups
Free improvisation ensembles
Musical groups established in 2008
Fred Frith
Intakt Records artists